Branko Smiljanić (born 27 September 1957) is a Serbian football manager and former footballer.

Playing career
In 1978, he signed a one-year contract with Mercator Ljubljana. He moved to OFK Beograd in 1979. In 1981, he signed a long-term contract with FK Sloboda Užice.

He first moved out of Serbia in 1983 to Sweden where he signed a contract with Kalmar AIK FK. After a two-year spell with the Kalmar-based club, he signed a contract with FC Mönsterås.

In 1988, he moved back to Serbia and signed with FK Obilić and played there for the next 5 years.

Managerial career
Smiljanić received the UEFA Pro Licence in 2007 from the Football Association of Serbia. He also holds the UEFA A License (from the Football Association of Serbia and Montenegro since 2005), UEFA B License (from the Swedish Football Association since 1988) and also the UEFA C License (from the Swedish Football Association since 1987). He has also obtained a graduate degree in Physical Education in 1996 from the University of Novi Sad.

He began his professional managerial career with the U-20 team of FK Obilić in 1993. In 1995, he was appointed as the assistant coach of the first team. In his one-year spell with the club, he helped them achieve the runners-up position in the 1994–95 FR Yugoslavia Cup.

In 1996, he was appointed as the head coach of FK Mladi Radnik. In 1997, he was appointed as the head coach of FK Sloga Kraljevo. In 1998, he was appointed as the head coach of FK Borac Čačak and helped the club win the 1998–99 Second League of FR Yugoslavia (West). In 1999, he was appointed as the head coach of FK Milicionar.

He first moved out of Serbia to the Middle East and more accurately to Jordan in 2001 where he was appointed as manager of the Jordan national football team.

In 2002, he moved back to FR Yugoslavia where he was appointed as the head coach of FK Sutjeska Nikšić.

In 2003, he moved back to Jordan and to the capital city, Amman where he was appointed as the head coach of Jordan League club, Al-Faisaly SC. In his one-year spell with the Amman-based club, he helped them secure the second position in the 2003–04 Jordan League, win the 2004 Jordan FA Cup and the 2004 Jordan Super Cup.

In 2004, he moved back to Serbia where he was appointed as the head coach of FK Vojvodina.

In 2005, he moved back to Jordan and his former club, Al-Faisaly SC. He again helped them secure the second position in the 2005–06 Jordan League and win the 2005 Jordan FA Cup.

In 2006, he moved to the North Africa and more accurately to Libya where he was appointed as the head coach of Libyan Premier League club, Al-Ittihad Club. In his two-year spell with the Tripoli-based club, he helped them win the 2006–07 Libyan Premier League, 2006 Libyan Super Cup, 2007 Libyan Al-Fatih Cup, 2007–08 Libyan Premier League and the 2007 Libyan Super Cup. He also helped the club to reach the Semi-finals of the 2007 CAF Champions League which is till-date the best performance of the club in the competition.

In 2008, he was appointed as the head coach of Libya national under-20 football team. During his one-year spell with the U20 national team, he helped them achieve the bronze medal in the 2009 Mediterranean Games. His team first topped the Group C with two draws against Montenegro U20 and with the help of a 4–2 penalty shootout win over the Europeans in the second match. In the semi-finals, they were defeated 1–0 by Italy U20 and in the third place match they won 8–7 on penalties against France U20 after the match had ended 0–0 at normal time.

After a successful stint with the Libya national U-20 team, he was appointed as the head coach of the Libya national football team on a three-year contract.

In October 2011, he was one of a number of managers the candidates for the vacant Rwanda national football team manager role.

In 2012, he moved back to Jordan where he was appointed as the head coach of Al-Wehdat SC, fierce rivals of his former club, Al-Faisaly SC. He helped the Amman New Camp-based club reach the quarter-finals of the 2012 AFC Cup. On 31 August 2012, he was sacked by the club after a 2–0 defeat against Al-Arabi (Irbid), the club's second defeat in the past three matches.

In 2013, he moved back to Libya and to his former club, Al-Ittihad on a one-year contract.

In 2014, he returned to Serbia where he was appointed as the head coach of Serbian SuperLiga club FK Napredak Kruševac.

On 20 November 2014, he arrived in Muscat, Oman and then moved to Saham where on 22 November 2014, he signed a six-month contract to be appointed as the head coach of Saham Club of Oman Professional League.

In February 2016, he was appointed manager of Thai League 1 club BEC Tero Sasana.

On 27 November 2016, he moved back to his former club, Al-Faisaly SC.

In 2017, he moved back to Montenegro where he was appointed as the head coach of Mladost Podgorica.

On 9 November 2018, Smiljanić was named the head coach of Al Ahli SC (Tripoli). On 23 March 2018, he left the club by mutual consent.

Personal life
His son, Milan Smiljanić is a professional footballer who has played for top European clubs like FK Partizan, RCD Espanyol, Sporting de Gijón, Gençlerbirliği S.K., Maccabi Netanya and is currently playing for FK Partizan. Branko is fluent in English, Serbian and Swedish.

Honors
Borac Čačak
Second League of FR Yugoslavia: 1998–99 (West)
Al-Faisaly
Jordan League runners-up: 2003–04, 2005–06
Jordan FA Cup: 2004, 2005
Jordan Super Cup: 2004
AFC Cup: 2005
Al-Ittihad (Tripoli)
Libyan Premier League: 2006–07, 2007–08
Libyan Cup: 2007
Libyan Super Cup: 2006, 2007
CAF Champions League semi-finals: 2007
Libya U-20
Mediterranean Games third place: 2009
Individual
Best Coach Award 2006, 2007, 2008

References

External links
 Official Website
 Branko Smiljanić – GOAL
 
 
 Branko Smiljanić – SOCCER PUNTER
 

1957 births
Living people
Footballers from Belgrade
Association football forwards
Yugoslav footballers
Serbia and Montenegro footballers
OFK Beograd players
FK Sloboda Užice players
FK Obilić players
Serbian football managers
Serbia and Montenegro football managers
FK Borac Čačak managers
Jordan national football team managers
FK Sutjeska Nikšić managers
Al-Faisaly SC managers
FK Vojvodina managers
Al-Ittihad Tripoli managers
Libya national football team managers
Al-Wehdat SC managers
FK Smederevo managers
FK Napredak Kruševac managers
Saham SC managers
Branko Smiljanic
OFK Titograd managers
Oman Professional League managers
Serbian expatriate football managers
Expatriate football managers in Jordan
Serbian expatriate sportspeople in Jordan
Expatriate football managers in Montenegro
Serbian expatriate sportspeople in Montenegro
Expatriate football managers in Libya
Serbian expatriate sportspeople in Libya
Expatriate football managers in Oman
Serbian expatriate sportspeople in Oman
AFC Cup winning managers
Yugoslav expatriate sportspeople in Sweden
Yugoslav expatriate footballers
Serbia and Montenegro expatriate sportspeople in Jordan
Serbia and Montenegro expatriate football managers